Altaf Hassan Qureshi (born  March 3, 1932) is a Pakistani Urdu journalist, political analyst, author, and editor-in-chief of monthly Urdu Digest.

Early life and education
Qureshi was born on March 3, 1932, in Hisar district, British India. He migrated to Pakistan in 1947 and settled in Lahore. He got his master's degree in political science from University of Punjab.

Career
Qureshi's elder brother Ejaz Hassan Qureshi had launched Urdu Digest in 1959, and he took the responsibility of being its first editor. He has been doing the editorial job for the digest to date. Besides Urdu Digest, Qureshi also pens columns in Urdu newspapers like Jang and others.

Qureshi started his career as a journalist when the ideological conflict between Communists and Islamists was at its peak in the 1960s and 1970s. He and his brother joined the right-wing camp and backed the religious forces working for an Islamic political system in Pakistan. He has been influenced by the writings of Abul A'la Maududi, a revolutionary Islamic scholar. He and his brother were jailed several times by the governments due to their opposing views and writings. His political analyses during the East Pakistan separation movement, after the military coups, and on other critical national events got the attention of every school of thought in the country.

Books
 Mulaqaatein
 Jang e Setambar Ki Yaadein (Memories of Indo-Pakistani War of 1965)
 Muqabil Hai Aaina
 Chhay Nukaat Ki Sachi Tasveer (Views on Six point movement)
 Mazeed Mulaqaatein
 Mulaqaatein Kaya Kaya (Interviews of different famous personalities)
 Nouk e Zaban

Awards
Qureshi is recipient of the following awards:
 Sitara-i-Imtiaz from government of Pakistan
 Life Time Achievement Award from All Pakistan Newspapers Society and Council of Pakistan Newspaper Editors

References

1932 births
Living people
Pakistani male journalists
Pakistani columnists
Pakistani editors
Pakistani prisoners and detainees
Recipients of Sitara-i-Imtiaz